"Start Movin' (In My Direction)" is a song written by Bobby Stevenson and David Hill, and performed by Sal Mineo featuring the Ray Ellis Orchestra.  It reached number 9 on the U.S. pop chart and number 16 on UK Singles Chart in 1957.

Other charting versions
Terry Dene released a version of the song which reached number 15 on the UK Singles Chart in 1957.

Other versions
Edna McGriff released a version of the song as the B-side to her 1957 single "Freight Train".

References

1957 songs
1957 singles
Songs written by David Hess
Epic Records singles